Posyolok otdeleniya 2 sovkhoza AMO is a rural locality (a settlement) in Amovskoye Rural Settlement, Novoanninsky District, Volgograd Oblast, Russia. The population was 132 as of 2010. There are 4 streets.

Geography 
The settlement is located in steppe on the Khopyorsko-Buzulukskaya Plain, 35 km southeast of Novoanninsky (the district's administrative centre) by road. Burnatsky is the nearest rural locality.

References 

Rural localities in Novoanninsky District